Events from the year 2002 in North Korea.

Incumbents
Premier: Hong Song-nam
Supreme Leader: Kim Jong-il

Events
 Japan–North Korea Pyongyang Declaration
 Second Battle of Yeonpyeong

References

 
North Korea
Years of the 21st century in North Korea
2000s in North Korea
North Korea